Hemlock is a heavy metal band from Las Vegas, Nevada, founded in 1993.

History 
Hemlock were founded in 1993 by Chad and Brian Smith in Las Vegas. A prolific touring band, they have performed multiple national tours, as well as international tours. They have performed as an opening act for groups such as Slayer, Slipknot, Ministry, Meshuggah, Trivium, and Lamb of God.

Discography 

 Controlance (1996)
 Shut Down (1999)
 Pigeonholed (2001)
 Bleed the Dream (2004)
 No Time for Sorrow (2008)
 Back in the Day (compilation album) (2012)
 The Only Enemy (2012)
 Viva 'Lock Vegas (live album) (2013)
 Mouth of the Swine  (2015)
 XXV (2018)
 Violence & Victory  (2021)
 Karmageddon  (2021)

Band members 
 Chad Smith – lead vocals, bass 
 Brian Smith – drums, percussion 
 Jerad Johnson – guitar, backing vocals
 Timothy Groce – guitar, backing vocals

References

External links 
 
 
 

Musical groups established in 1993
Musical groups from Las Vegas
Heavy metal musical groups from Nevada
Musical quartets
1993 establishments in Nevada